Fawkham Green see Fawkham

External links

Parish church

Villages in Kent